Francis Plain Playing Field is a multi-use sporting venue in Francis Plain, Saint Helena. The ground holds 2,000 and was built in 1970. It is used for cricket and football.

The Saint Helena Cricket Association (SHCA) utilises Francis Plain during the local cricket season which runs from December to May and includes a district league and three different tournaments. The cricket pitch is concrete overlaid with matting, rather than a traditional turf wicket.

References

External links 
Photos at cafe.daum.net/stade
Francis Plain Playing Field
 

Athletics (track and field) venues in Saint Helena
Sports venues completed in 1970
Football venues in British Overseas Territories
Football in Saint Helena
Cricket grounds in Africa
Cricket in Saint Helena